Andrew Chetcuti (born 19 November 1992 in Pietà) is a Maltese freestyle and butterfly swimmer specialising in short course events. He holds 5 individual national records, and 2 in relays.

Chetcuti was one of five athletes to represent Team Malta in the 2012 Summer Olympics. Chetcuti placed third in his heat of the 100 m freestyle, but did not qualify for the semi-finals.

Personal life 
Chetcuti currently lives in Atlanta, Georgia in the United States after residing in the United Arab Emirates, his place of residence since 1995. Chetcuti holds a Doctorate in Physical Therapy from MCPHS University and a Bachelors of Science in Biology from Georgia Institute of Technology.  Chetcuti attended high school at Dubai College where he was Head Boy.

Personal bests and records held 
Long course (50 m)

Short course (25 m)

References

External links
 

1992 births
Maltese male swimmers
Living people
Olympic swimmers of Malta
Swimmers at the 2012 Summer Olympics
Swimmers at the 2016 Summer Olympics
Swimmers at the 2020 Summer Olympics
Maltese expatriate sportspeople in the United Arab Emirates
People from Pietà, Malta
Swimmers at the 2013 Mediterranean Games
Mediterranean Games competitors for Malta